The U.S. state of Rhode Island has 70 state highways, coordinated and signed by the Rhode Island Department of Transportation (RIDOT). Most of these are partly or fully state highways, roads owned and maintained by RIDOT. Every city and town in Rhode Island, except for New Shoreham (Block Island), has at least one numbered route.

History

State highways in Rhode Island are signed with a standard square shield (for 2-digit routes) or a rectangular shield (for 3-digit routes), with black digits on a white background.  The state initials of R.I. are placed above the number, as seen in the adjacent picture.  The shields are similar to that of neighboring Massachusetts, though that state's route signs contain only the number.  On some older highway signs, state route shields occasionally omit the "R.I." above the number, but most newer signage (particularly along I-95) features the state initials.

Interstate Highways

U.S. Highways
Mainline routes

Special routes

Rhode Island Routes

See also

19th century turnpikes in Rhode Island
Downtown Circulator (Pawtucket)
New England Interstate Routes

References

External links
Rhode Island Highways Page
Road Signs of Rhode Island

 
Rhode Island
Routes